Eupithecia fulgurata is a moth in the family Geometridae. It is found in Kazakhstan.

References

Moths described in 1982
fulgurata
Moths of Asia